The 18th Utah Senate District is located in Davis and Weber Counties and includes Utah House Districts 8, 9, 10, 11, 13, and 16. The current State Senator representing the 18th district is Jon Greiner. Greiner was elected to the Utah Senate in 2006 and is up for re-election in 2010.

Previous Utah State Senators (District 18)

Election results

2006 General Election

See also
 Jon J. Greiner
 Utah Democratic Party
 Utah Republican Party
 Utah Senate

External links
 Utah Senate District Profiles
 Official Biography of Jon J. Greiner

18
Davis County, Utah
Weber County, Utah